Lee Fang-chih (born 20 September 1997) is a Taiwanese badminton player.

Achievements

BWF International Challenge/Series (3 titles, 2 runners-up) 
Men's doubles

  BWF International Challenge tournament
  BWF International Series tournament
  BWF Future Series tournament

References

External links 
 

1997 births
Living people
Taiwanese male badminton players